The Piano Teacher: A Healing Key is a play written by Canadian playwright Dorothy Dittrich. It is the winner of the 2022 Governor General's Literary Award for English-language drama. The play is available in paperback and was published by Talonbooks on September 6, 2022.

Plot 

Erin, a celebrated classical pianist, has been unable to play since the tragic deaths of her husband and son. For two years, she has been unable to touch the piano or even sit on its bench. She meets Elaine, a piano teacher who gently reacquaints her with the piano and provides her with new hope for the challenges that life will offer. With the help of Tom, who is there to renovate, a relationship quickly ensues. Elaine, too, begins to question herself as to why she is now teaching instead of playing.

Cast and production 
The Piano Teacher was commissioned by the Arts Club Theatre Company as part of its Silver Commissions Project.  It premiered on the Goldcorp Stage at the BMO Theatre Centre in Vancouver, British Columbia, on April 20, 2017, and played until May 14, 2017.

Characters and cast 
 Erin: Caitriona Murphy
 Elaine: Megan Leitch
 Tom: Kamyar Pazandeh

Creative and production team 
 Rachel  Ditor – Dramaturg
 Allison Spearin – Stage Manager
 Yvette  Nolan – Director
 Kyla  Gardiner – Lighting Designer
 David  Roberts – Set Designer
 Jenifer  Darbellay – Costumer Designer
 Patrick  Pennefather – Sound Designer
 Sandra Drag – Apprentice Stage Manager

Awards 
In 2017, The Piano Teacher won the Jessie Richardson Theatre Award for outstanding original script. In 2022, it received the Governor General's Award for English-language drama at the 2022 Governor General's Awards.

Reception 
The Piano Teacher has generally been well received. In The Georgia Straight, Kathleen Oliver called the play "a beautiful meditation on grief, loss, and the healing power of music." She further added, "Dittrich’s unadorned dialogue is refreshingly direct: the characters speak and listen intently to one another, usually without subtext." Theatre reviewer Jo Ledingham saw the play as "a beautiful, intelligent exploration of the power of music and friendship." She also declared, "I was moved by it and loved almost every minute."

References

External links 
 

2022 plays
Canadian plays
Governor General's Award-winning plays